Chancer is a British television crime drama serial, produced by Central Television for ITV, that first broadcast on 6 March 1990. Starring Clive Owen in the title role of Stephen Crane, Chancer tells the story of a likable conman and rogue at the end of the yuppie eighties. The first series concerns Crane's attempts to save an ailing car firm, which at first seems to be straightforward, until he is forced to reconcile himself with his past. In the second series, Crane, now using his real name of Derek Love, assists his friend Piers, who has inherited a stately home, and with it, a financial nightmare.

The series boasted a high-profile cast, including Simon Shepherd, Susannah Harker, Leslie Phillips and Peter Vaughan in leading roles. Notably, Christopher Eccleston also had one of his first television roles, featuring in the opening episode of series two as a prison inmate. Across the two series, a total of twenty episodes were broadcast, with both series airing on Tuesdays at 21:00. The theme music for the series was written by Jan Hammer. In 1991, Hammer's Miami Vice soundtrack "Crockett's Theme" was re-released with his Chancer theme tune as a double A-side, after the former featured in a series of NatWest adverts. The release charted at #47 on the UK Singles Chart.

Both series have since been released on DVD via Network, with a complete box set first issued on 4 October 2004.

Cast
 Clive Owen as Derek Love / Stephen Crane
 Simon Shepherd as Piers Garfield-Ward
 Susannah Harker as Joanna Franklyn
 Leslie Phillips as James Xavier 'Jimmy' Blake
 Peter Vaughan as Thomas 'Tom' Franklyn
 Ralph Riach as Willy Stebbings

Series 1 (1990)
 Caroline Langrishe as Penny Nichols 
 Benjamin Whitrow as Robert Douglas
 Lynsey Baxter as Victoria Douglas 
 Matthew Marsh as Gavin Nichols 
 Stephen Tompkinson as Markus Worton
 Cliff Parisi as Lunchbox
 Robert Glenister as Colin Morris
 Andy Linden as Dink
 Paul Barber as Gerald
 Maureen Glackin as Lorraine
 Karen Archer as Vanessa 
 Sam London as Tom Nichols
 Cathryn Bradshaw as Sonya Morris 
 Sean Pertwee as Jamie Douglas 
 Nicholas Shelton as Richard Nichols

Series 2 (1991)
 Louise Lombard as Anna 
 Jennie Linden as Olivia 
 Tom Tudgay as Joseph Franklyn 
 Ella Wilder as Ella 
 Derek Fowlds as Michael Coley

Episodes

Series 1 (1990)

Series 2 (1991)

References

External links

 Chancer at the British Film Institute (BFI)

ITV television dramas
1990 British television series debuts
1991 British television series endings
1990s British drama television series
Television series by ITV Studios
English-language television shows
Television shows produced by Central Independent Television